Ray Allen (born 1975) is an American former professional basketball player.

Ray Allen may also refer to:

Ray Allen (cricketer) (1908–1979), New Zealand cricketer
Ray Allen or R. S. Allen (1924–1981), American television writer and producer

See also
Ray Allan (born 1955), Scottish footballer
Ray Alan (1930–2010), English ventriloquist
Rae Allen (1926–2022), American actress and singer
Raymond Allen (disambiguation)